Gothi or  (plural , fem. ;) was a position of political and social prominence in the Icelandic Commonwealth. The term originally had a religious significance, referring to a pagan leader responsible for a religious structure and communal feasts, but the title is primarily known as a secular political title from medieval Iceland.

Etymology
In Scandinavia, there is one surviving attestation in the Proto-Norse form  from the Norwegian Nordhuglo runestone (Rundata N KJ65 U), and in the later Old Norse form  from three Danish runestones: DR 190 Helnæs, DR 192 Flemløse 1 and DR 209 Glavendrup. Otherwise, there are no further surviving attestations except from Iceland where the  would be of historical significance.

History

Mainland Scandinavia

From the pagan era in mainland Scandinavia, the only sources for the title are runestones. The Norwegian Nordhuglo stone from around AD 400 seems to place the title in opposition to magic, using a word related to the Old Norse . The inscription's  means "I, " followed by "he who is immune to sorcery" or "he who does not engage in sorcery". The three Danish stones are all from Funen. It thus attaches the title to a simultaneously secular and religious upper strata.

Iceland
Initially many independent  were established, until they united under the Althing around 930. In 964, the system was fixed under a constitution that recognized 39 . Over time, and especially after 1000, when the Christian conversion occurred in Iceland, the term lost all religious connotations and came to mean liege-lord or chieftain of the Icelandic Commonwealth. A  could be bought, shared, traded or inherited. If a woman inherited a  she had to leave the leadership to a man.

When quarter courts were introduced in the 960s, the  became responsible for nominating judges for the Althing courts. When a court of appeals was established in the early 11th century, they also nominated judges for this court. Further, they had a few formal and informal executive roles, such as confiscating the property of outlaws. They also had a central role in the redistribution of wealth, by holding feasts, giving gifts, making loans, extending hospitality, as well as pricing and helping to distribute imported goods.

These  struggled for regional and sometimes national power, and occasionally sought to become retainers for the Norwegian king. The institution came to an end when the major  pledged fealty to king Haakon IV of Norway in 1262–1264, signing the Old Covenant, and the Norwegian crown abolished the  system.

Neopaganism

See also
 Feudalism
 Hestavíg
 Sacred king
 Divine right of kings
 Thingmen
 Volkhv

References

Further reading

 Aðalsteinsson, Jón Hnefill (1998). "Blót and Þing: The Function of the Tenth-Century Goði, in A Piece of Horse Liver: Myth, Ritual and Folklore in Old Icelandic Sources, 35–56. Reykjavik. .

 
Priests
Norse paganism
Medieval titles
Political titles
Medieval Iceland
Viking Age in Iceland
Political history of Iceland